A walking tour is a tour of a historical or cultural site undertaken on foot, frequently in an urban setting. Short tours can last under an hour, while longer ones can take in multiple sites and last a full day or more. A walk can be led by a tour guide, as an escort.

Precursors
A pilgrimage is a religious journey traditionally taken on foot, to a location of significance to the walker's faith. Chaucer's 14th-century narrative poem Canterbury Tales certainly indicates that a pilgrimage can involve pleasure. 

The Camino de Santiago route to the shrine of the apostle Saint James the Great in the cathedral of Santiago de Compostela in Galicia in northwestern Spain is a famous example, and remains popular today.

In Iraq, the Shia Muslim 20-day Arba'een Pilgrimage to Karbala attracts many millions of pilgrims each year.

The Grand Tour, undertaken in Europe in the 17th through 19th centuries, as part of a wealthy young man's education, involved visits to cities, historic and cultural sites.

There are also similarities between walking tours that involve long hikes and backpacking.

Tours of cities and cultural sites

With guides
A walking tour is generally distinguished from an escorted tour by its length and the employment of tour guides, and can be under 12 hours, or last for a week or more. They are led by guides that have knowledge of the sites, or the landscape, covered on the tour, and explanations and interpretations of the site can cover a range of subjects, including places with historical, cultural and artistic significance. Walking tours, of various kinds and length, are universally part of the tourism industry, and can be found around the world.

Many walking tours involve a payment to the guide, although some operate on a tip system. The "pay what you want" model started around 2004, and can be found in many countries. The UK-based Guild of Registered Tour has criticised the system for not requiring any training or certification of its guides.

Narratives
Several cities now have groups that are employing dramatic spectacle to add interest to their tours.  Usually guided by actors in costume playing a role, these walking tours create the feel of living history as guests walk in the footsteps of those who came before them. These tours, which blend history and dramatic narrative, share "history in a non-academic, very accessible fashion."

These tours are similar in nature to promenade theatre. Although the theatrical nature of these tours is similar to museum theatre in that it makes use of first person interpretation, the fact that these tours take place outside of traditional museum settings and requires the audience to move through urban environments makes this style of walking tour a genre of its own.

Self guided tours
Self-guided tours, utilise a range of methods to aid travel through a place, or landscape, such as books, maps, pamphlets, and audio material.

Day tours with specific locations
Boston By Foot (Boston, USA)
Big Onion Walking Tours (New York City)
Photowalking
Caminhada Noturna, São Paulo
Walk in Hong Kong, Hong Kong

See also
Audio tour
Backpacking (hiking)
Backpacking (travel)
Heritage trail
Hiking
Walking bus

External links 
 Walking - miracle cure for body and soul
 Self guided walking and audio tour

References

Further reading
 MacCannell, Dean. The Ethics of Sightseeing. University of California Press, 2011.
 Pond, Kathleen Lingle. The Professional Guide: Dynamics of Tour Guiding. New York: Van Nostrand Reinhold, 1993.
 Ruitenberg, Claudia W. "Learning by Walking: Non-Formal Education as Curatorial Practice and Intervention in Public Space." International Journal of Lifelong Education 31, no. 3 (2012): 261-275.
 Wynn, Jonathan R. The Tour Guide: Walking and Talking New York. Chicago: The University of Chicago Press, 2011.
 Wynn, Jonathan R. "City Tour Guides: Urban Alchemists at Work." City & Community 9, no. 2 (June 2010).

Types of tourism
Tourist activities
Hiking